Hiram Willey (May 5, 1818 – March 8, 1910) was an American attorney who served as the United States Attorney for the District of Connecticut under two presidents. He was also a judge, member of the Connecticut senate, author, and the mayor of New London, Connecticut.

Biography 
Hiram was born on May 5, 1818 to Eathan Allen Willey and Mary Brockway in East Haddam, Connecticut. His ancestors  moved to Connecticut in 1645 and his grandfather Abraham Willey was a captain in the Revolutionary War. He was one of the first graduates of Wesleyan University of Middletown graduating in 1839. After passing the bar in 1841, he would be involved in numerous political and legal positions throughout Connecticut. He became State's Attorney; was a member of the Legislature and State Senate; Mayor of New London; Judge of Probate Court and of the Court of Common Pleas; returned to Hadlyme to reside in 1875; was lay reader in the P.E. Church of Hadlyme, member of F.& A.M.; First Grand Commander of the Encampment in New London. 
As the mayor of New London, he established the cities police force. In addition he wrote multiple books and was a professor at Yale.

References 

1818 births
1910 deaths
19th-century American male writers
19th-century American judges
19th-century American lawyers
Yale University faculty
American Freemasons
Connecticut state senators
Connecticut lawyers
Mayors of New London, Connecticut
Members of the Connecticut House of Representatives
United States Attorneys for the District of Connecticut